Hardzei Tsishchanka (born 16 August 1995) is a Belarusian professional racing cyclist, who currently rides for UCI Continental team . He rode at the 2015 UCI Track Cycling World Championships.

Major results
2014
 1st  Team pursuit, National Track Championships
2016
 1st  Team pursuit, National Track Championships
2017
 1st  Team sprint, National Track Championships
 3rd Time trial, National Under-23 Road Championships
2019
 1st  Team pursuit, National Track Championships

References

External links
 

1995 births
Living people
Belarusian male cyclists
People from Rechytsa
Cyclists at the 2019 European Games
European Games competitors for Belarus
Sportspeople from Gomel Region